Yanyu Road is an unopened station on Line 11 of the Shanghai Metro in Shanghai, China, located between  and  stations. Although it is part of the second phase of Line 11, it did not open with the other stations on August 31, 2013. Instead, it has been left as a reserved station under construction that will open in the future pending development in the area.

References

Line 11, Shanghai Metro
Shanghai Metro stations in Pudong